The Griswold Memorial Young Women's Christian Association, today known as the YWCA Center for Women, is a historic YWCA building in Downtown Columbus, Ohio. It was built in 1929 and was listed on the National Register of Historic Places in 1993. Renovations took place in 1963-64 and 1984. The building was named for Charles C. Griswold, and was a gift of his wife Mary, who donated about $400,000 to the YMCA's building fund.

The eight-story tower is built in the Second Italian Renaissance Revival style. It has a brick foundation, two stories of rusticated limestone, and an upper six stories of brick. There are five belt courses wrapping around the building.

See also
 National Register of Historic Places listings in Columbus, Ohio

References

External links

Official website

Buildings in downtown Columbus, Ohio
Commercial buildings completed in 1929
Commercial buildings on the National Register of Historic Places in Ohio
National Register of Historic Places in Columbus, Ohio
YWCA buildings
History of women in Ohio